Spodoptera pecten is a moth of the  family Noctuidae found from the Indo-Australian tropics to New Guinea. It has also been recorded from Japan and Hawaii.

The larvae feed on various grasses, but have also been recorded feeding on the seeds of Shorea curtisii.

The fully grown larva is brownish or greenish grey with paler dorsal and subdorsal stripes, the latter edged above with black lunules. There is a pale spiracular stripe edged above by purple.

Pupation takes place in the soil in a slight earthen cocoon.

See also
 African armyworm (Spodoptera exempta)

External links
Moths of Borneo
Japanese Moths

Spodoptera
Moths described in 1852
Moths of Japan
Taxa named by Achille Guenée